The first Sjahrir Cabinet was the second Indonesian cabinet, named after the Prime Minister. It served from November 1945 to February 1946.

Background
The first Sjahrir cabinet  was established following the 11 November 1945 demand from the Central Indonesian National Committee, which was the de facto legislature, that the cabinet be responsible to it, not to President Sukarno. The existing cabinet was dismissed and Sutan Sjahrir was asked to become prime minister. He agreed to do so on the condition he was allowed to select his own cabinet. The cabinet lineup was announced on 14 November 1945.

Composition
None of the ministers had served in the previous cabinet. The government was intended to be inclusive, with representation from the nationalist and the religious parties, the latter grouping being represented by the PSII.

Changes
There were several changes over the short life of this cabinet. On 5 December 1945, Finance Minister Soenarjo Kolopaking and Social Affairs Minister Adjidarmo Tjokronegoro resigned and were replaced by Soerachman Tjokroadisoerjo and Soedarsono respectively. On 3 January 1946, State Minister Rasjidi was appointed Minister of Religious Affairs, heading the new ministry established the same day. The following day, Muhammad Natsir took over Amir Sjarifuddin's job as Minister of Information. On 7 January 1946, Soegiono Josodiningrat was appointed to replace Junior Minister of People's Security Abdul Murad and the name of the ministry was changed to the Ministry of Defense.

The end of the cabinet
The Sjahrir cabinet fell as a result of the conflict between the Struggle Front of opposition politician Tan Malaka and Sjahrir over the latter's readiness to compromise with the Dutch before their colonial army had left Indonesia. Tan Malaka demanded a cabinet of national unity which secured widespread public support, prompting Sjahrir's resignation on 28 February 1946.

Notes

References
 Kahin, George McTurnan (1952) Nationalism and Revolution in Indonesia Cornell University Press, 
 Ricklefs (1982), A History of Modern Indonesia, Macmillan Southeast Asian reprint, 
 

Cabinets of Indonesia
Indonesian National Revolution
1945 establishments in Indonesia
1946 disestablishments in Indonesia
Cabinets established in 1945
Cabinets disestablished in 1946